The Toronto version of the NWA International Tag Team Championship was the top tag team professional wrestling championship in the Canadian promotion Maple Leaf Wrestling from 1961 through 1977. The title replaced the original top tag championship in Maple Leaf Wrestling, the NWA Canadian Open Tag Team Championship, which was abandoned in favor of the international title.

Title history

References

See also
Maple Leaf Wrestling
Other versions of the NWA International Tag Team Championship
Amarillo – 
Calgary – 
Georgia – 
Japan and Texas – 
Minneapolis – 
Vancouver – 

National Wrestling Alliance championships
Maple Leaf Wrestling championships
Tag team wrestling championships
Professional wrestling in Toronto